The 24 cm Theodor Bruno Kanone (E - Eisenbahnlafette (railroad mounting)) was a German railroad gun used during World War II in the Battle of France and on coast-defense duties in Occupied France for the rest of the war. Six were built during the 1930s using fifty-year-old ex-naval guns.

Design
As part of the re-armament program initiated by the Nazis after taking power in 1933 the Army High Command (Oberkommando des Heeres - OKH) ordered Krupp to begin work on new railroad artillery designs, but they would take a long time to develop. Krupp pointed out that it could deliver a number of railroad guns much more quickly using obsolete guns already on hand and modernizing their original World War I mountings for which it still had drawings available.

Six ancient 24 cm K L/35 C/88 guns originally used by the Odin-class coastal defense ships (Küstenpanzerschiff) that had equipped Batteries S1 at Sylt and Bremen at Norderney after those ships were disarmed in 1916 were placed on new mounts beginning in 1937. The gun could traverse only enough on the mount itself for fine corrections (the exact amount is disputed among the sources), coarser adjustments had to be made by turning the entire mount on the Vögele turntable. The turntable (Drehscheibe) consisted of a circular track with a pivot mount in the center for a platform on which the railroad gun itself was secured. A ramp was used to raise the railway gun to the level of the platform. The platform had rollers at each end which rested on the circular rail for 360° traverse. The gun could only be loaded at 0° elevation and so had to be re-aimed for each shot. All six guns were delivered by 1939.

Ammunition
The shells for this gun were loaded using a four-wheeled ammunition cart to move the shells and powder from the rear of the mount where it was hoisted from the ground or an ammunition car by the on-mount crane. It used the German naval system of ammunition where the base charge was held in a metallic cartridge case and supplemented by another charge in a silk bag which was rammed first.

Combat history
During the Battle of France Theodor Brunos equipped Batteries 664 (2 guns), 721 (1 gun), and 722 (2 guns). Their only known activity was when Battery 721 bombarded French casemates in the Vosges during June in support of the Seventh Army. From July 1941 two guns spent the rest of the war on coast defense duties assigned to Battery 664 in the vicinity of Hendaye and Saint-Jean-de-Luz near the Spanish border with France although sources differ on their arrival date. Battery 664 was able to retreat to Germany by 1 September 1944 after the invasion of Normandy began in June 1944, but nothing is known of its activities afterwards. Battery 721 transferred its one gun to Battery 722 sometime prior to June 1941 when the latter mustered four Theodor Brunos. Battery 722 defended Cherbourg Naval Base from 1941 to 1944 until being destroyed when the Americans captured the port on 30 June 1944.

Notes

References 
 Engelmann, Joachim. German Railroad Guns in Action. Carrollton, Texas: Squadron/Signal, 1976 
 Engelmann, Joachim and Scheibert, Horst. Deutsche Artillerie 1934-1945: Eine Dokumentation in Text, Skizzen und Bildern: Ausrüstung, Gliederung, Ausbildung, Führung, Einsatz. Limburg/Lahn, Germany: C. A. Starke, 1974
 François, Guy. Eisenbahnartillerie: Histoire de l'artillerie lourd sur voie ferrée allemande des origines à 1945. Paris: Editions Histoire et Fortifications, 2006
 Gander, Terry and Chamberlain, Peter. Weapons of the Third Reich: An Encyclopedic Survey of All Small Arms, Artillery and Special Weapons of the German Land Forces 1939-1945. New York: Doubleday, 1979 
 Hogg, Ian V. German Artillery of World War Two. 2nd corrected edition. Mechanicsville, PA: Stackpole Books, 1997 
 Kosar, Franz. Eisenbahngeschütz der Welt. Stuttgart: Motorbook, 1999

External links
 K L/35 at Navweaps.com

World War II artillery of Germany
Railway guns
240 mm artillery
Military equipment introduced in the 1930s